Lars Kramer (born 11 July 1999) is a Dutch professional footballer who plays as a centre-back for Danish Superliga club AaB.

Club career
Kramer played youth football with Fortuna Wormerveer before training with Ajax. In 2016 he made the switch to NEC, but a year later he opted for a transfer to FC Groningen.

He made his first team debut as a substitute for Groningen away against Feyenoord on 8 February 2018.

On 30 June 2019, Kramer joined Danish club Viborg FF on a 3-year deal.

International career
On 20 November 2018, Kramer made his debut for the Netherlands U20s during a 3–2 victory over Italy U20s in Katwijk aan Zee, coming on as a substitute for Shaquille Pinas in the 70th minute.

Honours
Viborg
Danish 1st Division: 2020–21

References

1999 births
Living people
Footballers from Zaanstad
Dutch footballers
Netherlands youth international footballers
Association football defenders
Eredivisie players
Derde Divisie players
Danish 1st Division players
Danish Superliga players
FC Groningen players
Viborg FF players
AFC Ajax players
NEC Nijmegen players
AaB Fodbold players
Dutch expatriate footballers
Expatriate men's footballers in Denmark
Dutch expatriate sportspeople in Denmark